The 2016–17 Boston University Terriers men's basketball team represented Boston University during the 2016–17 NCAA Division I men's basketball season. The Terriers, led by sixth-year head coach Joe Jones, played their home games at Case Gym as members of the Patriot League. They finished the season 18–14, 12–16 in America East play to finish in a tie for second place. As the No. 2 seed in the Patriot League tournament, they defeated Loyola (MD) in the quarterfinals before losing to Lehigh in double overtime in the semifinals.

Previous season
The Terriers finished the 2015–16 season 19–15, 11–7 in Patriot League play to finish in third place. They lost in the quarterfinals of the Patriot League tournament to American. They were invited to the CollegeInsider.com Tournament where they defeated Fordham in the first round before losing in the second round to NJIT.

Offseason

Departures

2016 recruiting class

2017 recruiting class

Roster

Schedule and results

|-
!colspan=9 style=| Non-conference regular season

|-
!colspan=9 style=| Patriot League regular season

|-
!colspan=9 style=| Patriot League tournament

References

Boston University Terriers men's basketball seasons
Boston University
Boston
Boston